Andriana Babali (Greek: Ανδριάνα Μπάμπαλη) is a Greek singer and songwriter.

Biography
Born and raised in Athens Greece, Andriana studied economics and music. She began singing as a vocalist/percussionist with rock singer-songwriter Nikos Portokaloglou Band in 1998. This led to her first studio recording 'Den Ein' Arga' from the OST of 'Brazilero', which became a major radio hit, and also her first solo album 'Kai I Gi Gyrizei', following a contract with Universal Music. She sang 'Gine Kommatia (Nocturnal Reggae)' on Portokaloglou's album 'Dipsa' and it became a major hit in both Greece and France. France's Ethnic Radio 'RFI Musique' included Gine Kommatia to their Top 10 list for over 3 months.

In 2004, Andriana was nominated for the 'Arion Awards' (Greece's most popular Music Awards) in the category for 'Best New Artist' and 'Best Female Pop Singer'. That same year, she appeared on Stefanos Korkolis's album 'Anemoptero' singing the title song, and on Kostas Livadas's 'Ti Hronia Ki Afti', singing 'Mia Mera Emine Akoma'.

During the Winter of 2004–2005, she performed alongside George Dalaras. In May 2005 she released her second studio album 'Min Pis Pote', following a new contract with Minos EMI.

In June 2007, she released her third studio album 'Des Kathara'.

During the summer of 2008, she performed alongside Haris Alexiou and Babis Stokas, giving concerts throughout Greece, Cyprus, Turkey, and Israel.

In May 2009, she released her fourth album 'The Rose Tattoo', a selection of 1950s and 1960s Greek and international hits, arranged by composer Minos Matsas. This album was recorded in Los Angeles and Athens, Greece, using Skype.In late 2010, Babali released her fifth studio album titled 'O Tzon Tzon Zi' (John-John is alive) which is entirely written and composed by lyricist  and virtuoso violist and composer Stamos Semsis.

Around that time, the successful Greek TV series The Island used  (from her 2009 album: The Rose Tattoo) for the series theme song, which ranked #1 in iTunes (Gr) sales, whilst it's been rereleased, included in the OST. The winter of 2011, she collaborated in the studio and in live performances with Michalis Hatzigiannis giving concerts across Greece, Cyprus, North America, and Canada.

After a studio collaboration with George Dalaras on his album 'Ti Tha Pei Etsi Einai', Andriana toured with him throughout Greece and Cyprus.

At the same time, she composed music for the 'Dagipoli Dance Co' show 'HUMATERRA', and performed live in it, giving shows in the Athens Concert Hall, in Istanbul and Piccolo Teatro (Milan).

Late 2014 she released "To Mazi Einai Dromos", an album containing her own compositions, with lyrics by Nikos Moraitis. Two years later the TV-series "I Leksi Pou De Les" used "Mesopelaga" from this album for series theme song.

During the winter of 2015–2016 she collaborated on stage with Babis Stokas, and the summer of 2016 gave concerts performing with the great Greek Composer Mimis Plessas.

In the summer of '18 she performed as a guest with international rock band Calexico at the Odeon of Herodes Atticus giving two sold out concerts.

Early '18 she released her first song with English lyrics "Spell", and later "L' Amour" with French lyrics written by Poseidonas Giannopoulos, followed by a Greek version with lyrics by Monsieur Minimal.

Actress
In 2010, Ari Bafalouka's (Director) film entitled 'Apnea', where Andriana co-starred with well known Greek actors such as Giorgos Karamihos, Youlika Skafida, Iro Moukiou and Akilas Karazisis, aired in the Montreal World Film Festival. The film received very positive reviews from critics and was selected for the Fipresci and Audience Award at the 51st Thessaloniki Film Festival, and the Audience Award 'Best Film' in SEE FEST – Los Angeles 2011. The film screened at several festivals worldwide, and premiered in Greek theatres in January 2011.
In early 2011, Andriana participated in a theatrical production for the first time, acting as well as singing, for Yorgos Nanouris's play 'Greece 11'.
 During winter '16-'17 she co starred in the musical theatre show "As Erhosoun Gia Ligo", the story of the great Greek composer Michalis Souyioul with Giannis Bezos and Tania Tripi
 Late 2019 she co starred with Marianna Toumasatou in "Nura Ena Penthimo Blues" a theatre play about refugees in Greece by Vassia Argenti, singing and acting. The theme song was nominated for "Best Theatre Play Song" in the 2020 Korfiatika Theatre Awards.
 During summer 2021 she is co starring with Christos Thivaios, Violeta Ikari and Kostas Triantafyllidis in the musical theatre play "Pos Na Sopaso", with the great Kostas Kazakos as narrator, directed by Tzeni Kollia.

Quarderinas
Having formed an "All Girl" group (Andriana Babali Quarderinas Quartet) she is touring across Greece and Cyprus.

Discography

Albums

Single

Collaborations

Awards and nominations

Korfiatika Theatre Awards

Arion Music Awards

MAD Video Music Awards

References

External links 
Official YouTube Artist Channel
Shazam Profile
Facebook Official Page
Instagram Official Account
Official Twitter Account
Spotify Artist
Apple Music, iTunes Store
last.fm Profile
Soundcloud
Andriana Babali Quarderinas Quartet EPK
MySpace Page

Greek entehno singers
Minos EMI artists
Greek singer-songwriters
Living people
21st-century Greek women singers
1976 births
Singers from Athens